Maple Grove Cemetery is a historic cemetery at 127-15 Kew Gardens Road in Briarwood/Kew Gardens, Queens, New York City, New York.  It was added to the National Register of Historic Places in 2004.


History
Maple Grove is a 65-acre cemetery established in 1875 on the "Backbone of Long Island" by Colonel William Sterling Cogswell and business associates. It consists of two sections; Monumental Park and Memorial Park. The Victorian Era Monumental Park was the first section opened in 1875 and laid out in the rural cemetery tradition with panoramic winding roads through a forest covered hilly terrain, with the original entrance at Queens Boulevard. The Lodge Building, located at the Queens Boulevard entrance, and the Receiving Tomb were erected in 1875. The Victorian Administration Building was erected in 1880 at the Lefferts Boulevard and Kew Gardens Road Entrance. All were designed by noted New York City architect James E. Ware (1846–1918).

The Memorial Park section was opened in 1943. The Lodge was torn down and the original Queens Boulevard Entrance was moved further south on Queens Boulevard, next to Briarwood subway station.  Memorial Park's Presidential Circle includes a memorial to the 21 people interred at Maple Grove who died in the 2001 terrorist attack on the World Trade Center.  There are approximately 83,000 interments, with approximately 30,000 of them in the Monumental Park section. In Memorial Park the new Center at Maple Grove building, designed by architect Peter Gisolfi, was opened in 2009. The Maple Grove offices were moved from the old Victorian Administration Building into the Center. It also houses the Celebration Hall, Community Room, the Columbarium etc. A third entrance was created next to the Center on Kew Gardens Road at 129th Street.

Friends of Maple Grove

The Friends of Maple Grove Cemetery, Inc. is a not-for-profit, membership organization with the purposes of supporting and enhancing the operations of Maple Grove Cemetery, located in Kew Gardens, Queens, New York. Friends members desire to increase public knowledge and appreciation of the artistic, historical, horticultural and cultural resources of the Cemetery. The Friends promotes ties between Maple Grove Cemetery and the community it serves and sponsors a variety of programs and activities.

Notable interments
 LaVern Baker (1911–1997), rhythm-and-blues singer
 Albert H. Bosch (1908–2005), member of the US House of Representatives
 Martin Branner (1888–1970), cartoonist
 George W. Corliss (1834–1903), soldier, Civil War Congressional Medal of Honor recipient
 Leslie Kaliades (1961–1999), artist known for her photography about her experience with AIDS
 Anthony Mason (1966–2015), basketball player
 Irving Rapper (1898–1999), film director
 Jimmy Rushing (1901–1972), singer
 George Coles Stebbins (1846–1945), gospel hymn writer
 Fred Taral (1867–1927), U.S. Racing Hall of Fame jockey
 James E. Ware (1846–1918), architect
 Edward Wright, (1829–1901), sailor, Civil War Congressional Medal of Honor recipient
 Vincent Youmans (1898–1946), songwriter

References

External links

 
 

Cemeteries on the National Register of Historic Places in New York City
1875 establishments in New York (state)
Cemeteries in Queens, New York
Kew Gardens, Queens
National Register of Historic Places in Queens, New York
Historic districts in Queens, New York